Leon Brown may refer to:

 Leon Brown (baseball) (born 1949), American baseball outfielder
 Leon Brown (basketball) (1919–1990), American basketball player
 L. Carl Brown (1928–2020), emeritus professor of history at Princeton University
 Leon Brown (American football) (born 1993), American football guard
 Leon Brown (rugby union) (born 1996), Welsh rugby union player